130th Regiment may refer to:

 130th Regiment of Foot, a disestablished unit of the British Army (1794-96)
 130th Illinois Volunteer Infantry Regiment, a unit of the Union (North) Army during the American Civil War